Bryn Gweled is a small community in Upper Southampton Township, Bucks County, Pennsylvania.

The community was founded in 1940 by thirteen mostly Quaker families from the Philadelphia area.  The name of the community means "Hill of Vision" in Welsh.  The community maintains its founders' vision of collective responsibility, consensus-style management, and racial diversity, and has been cited as an example of community-based decision-making in action.

Some of the house architecture was created by various students of the famous American architect Frank Lloyd Wright such as Robert Forsythe Bishop and others who went on to have distinguished further careers.  The homes are located on two acre plots, nestled into fields and forests, an oasis from the surrounding Philadelphia suburban sprawl. Several of the homes feature unique architectural elements such as heated floors, exposed wooden beams, wide open interior spaces, central fireplaces typical of organic architecture and Usonian homes.

Notable people
Margaret H. Lippert, an award-winning author of books and anthologies

Mario Capecchi, Nobel Prize-winning molecular geneticist

James H. Rowe, a dog walker who found a down man in the road, effectively summoning help to save life of commune president.

Notes

Intentional communities in the United States
Unincorporated communities in Bucks County, Pennsylvania
Unincorporated communities in Pennsylvania